Operation Whirlwind is a 1983 video game published by Broderbund Software.

Gameplay
Operation Whirlwind is a game in which Northern France is the setting for this battalion level strategy game.

Reception
Mark J. Bausman reviewed the game for Computer Gaming World and stated, "Although not as complex as some computer wargames, this game provides the elements of a good tactical duel." Softline found the approachability to be a plus: "For people who have avoided the mammoth games by Strategic Simulations and Avalon Hill simply because each game swallows hours of one's life and there's so much information to keep track of, Operation Whirlwind is a godsend." The reviewer also complimented the writing quality of the manual.

Reviews
Electronic Fun with Computers & Games - Feb, 1984
Zzap! - Jul, 1985
Computer Gaming World - Dec, 1991

References

External links
Review in Compute!
Review in Antic
Review in ANALOG Computing
Review in Family Computing
Review in Softline
Review in TPUG Magazine
Review in Commodore User
Article in Micro Adventurer

1983 video games
Ariolasoft games
Atari 8-bit family games
Broderbund games
Computer wargames
Commodore 64 games
Turn-based strategy video games
Video games developed in the United States
World War II video games